John Aasand (born c. 1950) is an American curler, a  and a 1972 United States men's curling champion.

That 1972 silver medallist team is best known for the "Curse of LaBonte" - one of the most famous curses in curling history. It was caused by an incident at the finals of the 1972 world men's curling championship, the 1972 Air Canada Silver Broom in Garmisch-Partenkirchen, Germany.

Personal life
Aasand attended the University of North Dakota. He is the owner of a sportsbar in Grafton named "The Extra End", an allusion to the team's extra end loss at the 1972 Worlds. He is married and has one daughter.

Teams

References

External links
 

1950s births
American curling champions
American male curlers
Businesspeople from North Dakota
Living people
People from Walsh County, North Dakota
University of North Dakota alumni